The 1988 King of the Ring was the fourth annual King of the Ring professional wrestling tournament produced by the World Wrestling Federation (WWF, now WWE). The tournament was held on October 16, 1988 at the Providence Civic Center in Providence, Rhode Island as a special non-televised house show. The 1988 tournament was won by Ted DiBiase. In addition to the tournament, there was only one other match during the night. In this match Jim Duggan defeated Dino Bravo (with Frenchy Martin) in a flag match. Duggan pinned Bravo when Martin accidentally hit Bravo with the flag.

Production

Background
The King of the Ring tournament was an annual single-elimination tournament that was established by the World Wrestling Federation (WWF, now WWE) in 1985 with the winner being crowned the "King of the Ring." The 1988 tournament was the fourth King of the Ring tournament. It was held on October 16, 1988 at the Providence Civic Center in Providence, Rhode Island and like the previous years, it was a special non-televised house show.

Storylines
The matches resulted from scripted storylines, where wrestlers portrayed heroes, villains, or less distinguishable characters in scripted events that built tension and culminated in a wrestling match or series of matches. Results were predetermined by World Wrestling Federation's writers.

Results

Tournament bracket

1.  Mike Sharpe substituted for The Warlord.
2.  DiBiase paid Bass off to fake an injury.
3.  Randy Savage was counted out when he became distracted by Virgil on the outside of the ring.

References

1988
1988 in professional wrestling
1988 in Rhode Island
Events in Rhode Island
Professional wrestling in Providence, Rhode Island
October 1988 events in the United States